Back Su-Yeon (also Baek Su-Yeon, ; born July 1, 1991 in Seoul) is a South Korean swimmer, who specialized in breaststroke events. She edged out her teammate Jung Seul-Ki to take a bronze medal by 0.31 of a second in the 200 m breaststroke at the 2010 Asian Games in Guangzhou, China, with a time of 1:10.22. Back is also a member of Kang-won-do Cheong swimming club in Seoul.  Previously in 2006, Back had won bronze in the 100 m breaststroke at the 2006 Asian Games.

Back qualified for the women's 200 m breaststroke at the 2012 Summer Olympics in London, by eclipsing the FINA A-standard entry time of 2:26.61 at the FINA World Championships in Shanghai, China. Back shared the seventh fastest qualifying time of 2:25.76 with China's Ji Liping in the morning's preliminary heats to secure a spot for the semifinals. In the evening session, Back missed out the final; the top eight fastest swimmers in the semifinals qualified and she was the ninth fastest swimmer; 0.21 of a second behind the eighth-fastest qualifier, lowering her Olympic time to 2:24.67.  In the same year, she won two silver medals, in the 100 and 200 m breaststroke at the Asian Championships.

She competed in the 200 m breaststroke at the 2016 Summer Olympics, but did not qualify from the heats.

References

External links
NBC Olympics Profile

1991 births
Living people
Swimmers from Seoul
South Korean female breaststroke swimmers
Swimmers at the 2012 Summer Olympics
Swimmers at the 2016 Summer Olympics
Olympic swimmers of South Korea
Swimmers at the 2006 Asian Games
Swimmers at the 2010 Asian Games
Swimmers at the 2014 Asian Games
Swimmers at the 2018 Asian Games
Asian Games medalists in swimming
Medalists at the 2006 Asian Games
Asian Games bronze medalists for South Korea
21st-century South Korean women